Prosoplus paganoides is a species of beetle in the family Cerambycidae. It was described by Stephan von Breuning in 1940. It is known from Papua New Guinea and Moluccas.

References

Prosoplus
Beetles described in 1940